David Peter Winnie (born 26 October 1966) is a Scottish former football player and manager of Dumbarton. He is presently a solicitor based in central London. 

A defender on the field, Winnie was part of St Mirren's 1987 Scottish Cup Final-winning team. He also played for Aberdeen, Dundee and Hearts, and was a Scotland U21 international. After leaving Scotland in 1998, he played for KR Reykjavik where he won the Icelandic player of the year. In 1999, Winnie helped KR win the Icelandic Premier League and Cup for the first time in 30 years, following which he went on loan to Canberra Cosmos in Australia for a season before returning to Iceland.

In 2001, Winnie was then assistant manager at KR before a brief caretaker role saw him steer them from relegation danger. Winnie was then part of the youth academy coaching staff at Livingston and Rangers.

Winnie was manager of Dumbarton from June 2002 until his sacking in March 2003, when the Sons were struggling in the Second Division. He was replaced by Bo'ness United manager Brian Fairley.

Winnie trained to become a solicitor at a law firm in St. Albans and qualified in November 2009. He became head of the Sports Law Department at Blaser Mills Law, a law firm with offices in the City of London and south east England.

Manager statistics

Honours 
St Mirren
Scottish Cup: 1986–87
Renfrewshire Cup: 1984–85
Aberdeen

 Scottish Premier League -  Runners up: 1992-93
 Scottish Cup - Runners up: 1992-93
 Scottish League Cup - Runners up: 1992-93

KR Reykjavík
Icelandic League: 1999, 2000
Runners-up: 1998
Icelandic Cup: 1999
Icelandic League Cups: 1998 2001

References

1966 births
Aberdeen F.C. players
Ayr United F.C. players
Dumbarton F.C. managers
Dundee F.C. players
Expatriate footballers in Iceland
Expatriate football managers in Iceland
Heart of Midlothian F.C. players
Knattspyrnufélag Reykjavíkur managers
Living people
Middlesbrough F.C. players
Footballers from Glasgow
Scottish expatriate footballers
Scottish expatriate sportspeople in Iceland
Scottish Football League players
Scottish footballers
Scottish solicitors
St Mirren F.C. players
Scotland under-21 international footballers
Scottish Football League managers
Association football defenders
Scottish football managers
Rangers F.C. non-playing staff